Huckelheimer Bach is a small river of Bavaria, Germany. It is the right headwater of the Westerbach  in Westerngrund.

See also
List of rivers of Bavaria

References

Rivers of Bavaria
Rivers of the Spessart
Rivers of Germany